The National Taichung Theater (POJ: Tâi-Tiong Kok-Ka Koa-Ke̍k-Īⁿ) is an opera house in the Taichung's 7th Redevelopment Zone in the Situn District of Taichung, Taiwan. It was designed by Japanese architect Toyo Ito in collaboration with Cecil Balmond at Arup AGU. It was contracted on 11 November 2009 with construction planned for 45 months. The venue had a partial opening on 23 November 2014. It was officially opened in 2016.

History 
 1992: Taiwan government first proposed as National Musical House
 2002: Jason Hu proposed to build in Taichung
 2003: 6 billion TWD was allocated to the budget
 2006: Contracted with a local company
 2009: Contract signed with Toyo Ito
 23 November 2014: Completed, opening ceremony held
 2015: Closed for additional works to improve safety of visitors
 25 August 2016: The National Taichung Theater became an artistic affiliate of the National Performing Arts Center

Gallery

See also 
 National Kaohsiung Center for the Arts
 National Theater and Concert Hall, Taipei

References

External links 

 National Taichung Theater 
 臺中大都會歌劇院

2014 establishments in Taiwan
Buildings and structures in Taichung
Concert halls in Taiwan
Taiwan
Theatres in Taiwan
Tourist attractions in Taichung
Taichung's 7th Redevelopment Zone
Postmodern architecture in Taiwan
Toyo Ito buildings